The White County Courthouse is located at Court Square in the center of Searcy, Arkansas, the county seat of White County.  It is a two-story structure, built out of stone and brick, with a hip roof capped by an elaborate cupola with clock faces in its bowed roof.  The building is roughly H shaped, with wings at the sides that project slightly to the front and rear.  The ground floor is faced in dressed stone, while the upper floor is finished in brick.  Entrance is made through an arcade of rounded arches, which support a Greek pedimented temple projection that has four fluted Corinthian columns. The courthouse was built in 1871 and enlarged by the addition of the wings in 1912.  In addition, repairs were conducted by the Civil Works Administration in 1933.

The building was listed on the National Register of Historic Places in 1977.

See also
National Register of Historic Places listings in White County, Arkansas

References

Courthouses on the National Register of Historic Places in Arkansas
Neoclassical architecture in Arkansas
Government buildings completed in 1871
White
National Register of Historic Places in Searcy, Arkansas
1871 establishments in Arkansas